Jafarabad-e Jangal may refer to:

Jafarabad-e Jangal, Damavand
Jafarabad-e Jangal, Tehran
Jafarabad-e Jangal, Varamin